KPRK (1340 AM) is a radio station licensed to serve Livingston, Montana.  The station is owned by Townsquare Media and the broadcast license is held by Townsquare License, LLC.  KPRK airs a news/talk format, simulcasting sister station KMMS.

History
Previous formats included country, Saturday night Rock and Roll, and Sunday morning Big Band. During the weekdays a segment of the afternoon shift was dedicated to local callers to hawk their goods with free advertising through the "Swap Shop" segment. Broadcasts started around 5:30AM local time with the broadcast day ending at midnight. KPRK also broadcast local high school sports, rodeos and fairs. Several locals were also familiar faces or voices on the station for many years. KPRK also broadcast local news three times a day with the local court report during that time. KPRK staff received several awards for their news contributions to the Montana AP for news reports gathered during 1999. The former country music slogan was "Cool Country 1340 KPRK". The station also featured an uninterrupted "Cool Country Triple Play" where two newer songs were played followed by a "Hit from Yesterday", otherwise known as a country classic.

As of 2019, KPRK is simulcasting its News/Talk sister station KMMS.

The station was assigned the KPRK call letters by the Federal Communications Commission.

Previous logo

Ownership
In February 2008, Colorado-based GAPWEST Broadcasting completed the acquisition of 57 radio stations in 13 markets in the Pacific Northwest-Rocky Mountain region from Clear Channel Communications.  The deal, valued at a reported $74 million, included six Bozeman stations, seven in Missoula and five in Billings. Other stations in the deal are located in Shelby, Montana, and in Casper and Cheyenne, Wyoming, plus Pocatello and Twin Falls, Idaho, and Yakima, Washington.  GapWest was folded into Townsquare Media on August 13, 2010.

Previous owners include Jan Lambert, Marathon Media, and Clear Channel.

Historic building

The KPRK radio building in Livingston is on the National Register of Historic Places. To the right of the front door, a plaque says that Missoula architect William Fox designed the building, complete with the "stylized radio tower" above the front door, in 1946.

According to reports in the Livingston Enterprise, Gap West has stopped broadcasting from the historic building. All broadcasts are now fed from the Bozeman, MT studios.

References

External links

PRK
News and talk radio stations in the United States
Radio stations established in 1946
1946 establishments in Montana
Townsquare Media radio stations
National Register of Historic Places in Park County, Montana
Commercial buildings on the National Register of Historic Places in Montana
Telecommunications buildings on the National Register of Historic Places
Streamline Moderne architecture in Montana
History of radio